Lathom South is a civil parish in the West Lancashire district of Lancashire, England.  It contains four listed buildings that are recorded in the National Heritage List for England.  All the listed buildings are designated at Grade II, the lowest of the three grades, which is applied to "buildings of national importance and special interest".  The parish is rural, and all the listed buildings are farmhouses or farm buildings.


Buildings

See also

Listed buildings in Lathom

References

Citations

Sources

Lists of listed buildings in Lancashire
Buildings and structures in the Borough of West Lancashire